Pankhuri Awasthy Rode (born 31 March 1991) is an Indian actress who mainly works in Hindi television. She made her acting debut in 2014 with Yeh Hai Aashiqui portraying Saima. Awasthy Rode is best known for her portrayal of Razia Sultan in Razia Sultan and Draupadi in Suryaputra Karn.

Awasthy's other notable include portraying Vedika in Yeh Rishta Kya Kehlata Hai and Kajal Bhatt Khurana in Gud Se Meetha Ishq. She made her film debut with Shubh Mangal Zyada Saavdhan in 2021.

Early life
Awasthy Rode was born on 31 March 1991 in Lucknow, Uttar Pradesh. She grew up in Delhi but moved to Bangalore for a job in marketing. In 2014, she ultimately moved to Mumbai to pursue a career in acting.

Personal life
In October 2017, Awasthy got engaged to actor Gautam Rode. Awasthy and Rode got married on 5 February 2018 in Alwar.

Career 
Awasthy Rode played the role of Seher in MTV Fanaah Season 2. After that, she played the role of Razia Sultan in &TV’s historical drama Razia Sultan. She also played Draupadi in the mythological drama Suryaputra Karn. In 2017, she played the lead role of Amla in Star Plus’s show Kya Qusoor Hai Amala Ka?, which is an Indian adaptation of famous Turkish show Fatmagül'ün Suçu Ne?.

In 2019, she played an episodic role in the Colors TV's show Kaun Hai? as Pauloma / Anvesha and also appeared in the & TV's show Laal Ishq. From June 2019 to January 2020 she played the role of Vedika Agarwal in Star Plus's drama Yeh Rishta Kya Kehlata Hai.

Rode made her debut in Hindi cinema with Shubh Mangal Zyada Saavdhan, which was released on 21 February 2020. In 2022, she portrayed Kajal Bhatt Khurana in Gud Se Meetha Ishq.

Filmography

Films

Television

Web series

Awards and nominations

Notes

References

External links
 
 

1991 births
Living people
Indian soap opera actresses
Indian television actresses
People from Lucknow
Actresses from Mumbai